New Florence is a borough in Westmoreland County, Pennsylvania, United States. It was named for the city of Florence in Italy. The population was 689 as of the 2010 census, which is a decrease from 784 recorded by the 2000 census. It is also one of three communities within the county to utilise the 814 area code, alongside St. Clair and Seward.

Geography
New Florence is located at  (40.379707, -79.074841).

Surrounding and adjacent neighborhoods

New Florence is bordered by St. Clair Township to the east, south and west.  Across the Conemaugh River in Indiana County to the north, New Florence runs adjacent with West Wheatfield Township and has a direct connector via the 9th Street Bridge.

Demographics

As of the census of 2000, there were 784 people, 331 households, and 225 families living in the borough. The population density was 2,242.4 people per square mile (864.9/km2). There were 365 housing units at an average density of 1,044.0 per square mile (402.6/km2). The racial makeup of the borough was 99.11% White, 0.13% Native American, 0.13% from other races, and 0.64% from two or more races. Hispanic or Latino of any race were 0.13% of the population.

There were 331 households, out of which 27.2% had children under the age of 18 living with them, 50.8% were married couples living together, 14.2% had a female householder with no husband present, and 32.0% were non-families. 29.9% of all households were made up of individuals, and 16.9% had someone living alone who was 65 years of age or older. The average household size was 2.37 and the average family size was 2.91.

In the borough the population was spread out, with 23.3% under the age of 18, 6.9% from 18 to 24, 24.5% from 25 to 44, 24.4% from 45 to 64, and 20.9% who were 65 years of age or older. The median age was 42 years. For every 100 females, there were 93.6 males. For every 100 females age 18 and over, there were 79.4 males.

The median income for a household in the borough was $24,688, and the median income for a family was $28,750. Males had a median income of $31,667 versus $19,792 for females. The per capita income for the borough was $13,449. About 19.3% of families and 21.6% of the population were below the poverty line, including 42.9% of those under age 18 and 7.2% of those age 65 or over.

References

Boroughs in Westmoreland County, Pennsylvania
Populated places established in 1865
Pittsburgh metropolitan area
1865 establishments in Pennsylvania